Pyxine is a genus of foliose lichens in the family Caliciaceae. The genus has a widespread distribution in tropical regions.

The presence or absence of the compound lichexanthone is a character used in classifying Pyxine  species; about 20 species contain this compound. This represents the largest group of foliose lichens with the compound.

Species

Pyxine albovirens 
Pyxine astipitata  – Brazil
Pyxine astridiana  – neotropical
Pyxine australiensis  – Asia; Australia
Pyxine berteriana  – pantropical
Pyxine boonpragobiana  – Thailand
Pyxine coccifera 
Pyxine cocoes 
Pyxine cognata  - pantropical
Pyxine consocians 
Pyxine convexior 
Pyxine copelandii 
Pyxine cylindrica  – Papua New Guinea
Pyxine dactyloschmidtii 
Pyxine daedalea  – Costa Rica
Pyxine desudans  – Australia
Pyxine elixii  – Australia
Pyxine endochrysina 
Pyxine endocrocea 
Pyxine eschweileri 
Pyxine exoalbida  – Brazil
Pyxine fallax 
Pyxine farinosa  – Papua New Guinea
Pyxine flavicans 
Pyxine glaucovirescens 
Pyxine hengduanensis 
Pyxine jolyana  – Brazil
Pyxine katendei  – Africa
Pyxine keralensis  – India
Pyxine lilacina  – Africa
Pyxine lyei  – Africa
Pyxine mantiqueirensis  – Brazil
Pyxine mexicana 
Pyxine minuta 
Pyxine nana  – neotropical
Pyxine nubila 
Pyxine petricola  – pantropical
Pyxine plumea  – Australia
Pyxine profallax 
Pyxine pseudokeralensis 
Pyxine papuana  – Papua New Guinea
Pyxine punensis  – India
Pyxine pungens 
Pyxine pustulata  – Brazil
Pyxine pyxinoides  – neotropical
Pyxine retirugella 
Pyxine rugulosa 
Pyxine schmidtii 
Pyxine simulans  - pantropical
Pyxine sorediata 
Pyxine subcinerea  – pantropical
Pyxine subcoralligera 
Pyxine yercaudensis  – India
Pyxine yunnanensis  – China

References

Caliciales genera
Caliciales
Lichen genera
Taxa named by Elias Magnus Fries
Taxa described in 1825